Linda Carroll (born Linda Anne Risi; April 7, 1944) is an American author, marriage counselor, and family therapist. Carroll received national attention in 1993 when one of her patients, the fugitive Katherine Ann Power, turned herself in to authorities after spending twenty-three years eluding police. Carroll is best known professionally as a couples therapist, and as an author of three books, the latest being Love Cycles: The Five Essential Stages of Lasting Love, in 2014.

She has worked as a couple's therapist for more than 30 years. In addition to being a licensed psychotherapist, she is certified in Imago Therapy, the couple's therapy developed by Dr. Harville Hendrix and Dr. Helen LaKelly Hunt. She is also a master teacher in the Pairs Psychoeducation Process, a nationally recognized relationship education program for couples. Carroll studied Voice Dialogue with Drs. Hal and Sidra Stone, Holotropic Breathwork with Dr. Stanislav Grof, the Four-Fold with Angeles Arrien, the Diamond Heart Work of A.H. Almaas, and trained with The Couples Institute of Drs. Ellyn Bader and Peter Pearson. She is also certified in the Hot Monogamy program, which helps couples create or re-create a passionate connection between them.

She teaches workshops and delivers keynote addresses throughout the United States and is a frequent speaker at Rancho La Puerta in Tecate, Baja California, Mexico.

Born and raised in San Francisco, Linda Carroll now lives in Corvallis, Oregon, with her veterinarian husband, Tim Barraud. She is the mother of singer and musician Courtney Love, and the daughter of novelist Paula Fox.

Biography
Carroll was born on April 7, 1944 in San Francisco, California to writer Paula Fox, who was 20 years old at the time of her birth. Carroll was conceived of a short-lived relationship between Fox and an unnamed man. Fox lived under the roof of acting coach Stella Adler at the time, as did then unknown actor Marlon Brando. There have been persistent rumors that Brando was in fact Carroll's father, although neither Brando nor Fox ever commented on the matter. Carroll did not meet her birth mother until later in life. Carroll's maternal grandfather was screenwriter Paul Hervey Fox, and her grandmother, Elsie Fox (née de Sola) was a Cuban writer. 

Fox gave Carroll up for adoption at birth. She was adopted by optician Emil "Jack" and Louella Risi, a Catholic family of part Italian descent, and raised in the Pacific Heights neighborhood of San Francisco. Later in life, she took the surname Carroll following the death of her friend, Judy Carroll. Linda graduated from high school in 1961.

She married writer and publisher Hank Harrison in 1963 in Reno, Nevada and gave birth to a daughter, Courtney Michelle Harrison on July 9, 1964. Within years of Courtney's birth, both Carroll's adoptive parents died. She divorced Harrison after eighteen months of marriage, alleging that he had given her the drug LSD, and brought her daughter Courtney with her to Marcola, Oregon. She had two other daughters, Nicole and Jaimee, with her second husband, Frank Rodríguez.

After finishing her bachelor's degree in Oregon in the 1970s, she moved to New Zealand. She returned to Oregon in the 1980s, received a masters in counseling, and began practicing as a therapist. Carroll and her veterinarian husband, Tim Barraud, began to teach a couples course based on the Imago work of Harville Hendrix, the PAIRS training of Dr. Lori Gordon, and their own insights, study, and practices.

As an adult, Carroll found that her birth mother is the novelist Paula Fox (her grandmother was screenwriter Elsie Fox).
In  2006, her memoir Her Mother's Daughter: A Memoir of the Mother I Never Knew and of My Daughter, Courtney Love, was published by Doubleday. Love's agent called the book a work of "vicious and greedy fiction", and said, "We find it astonishing that any mother should write such a book. This is especially true in the case of Ms Carroll, who abandoned her daughter when she was a seven-year-old and whom Ms Love thus barely knows at all." Linda Carroll, however, contends in her memoir that she left Courtney with a friend for just two months at age nine while she was looking for a home in New Zealand and that Courtney remained with her until she emancipated herself at age 16. Linda Carroll has not spoken to her daughter in years and remains estranged.

"Far from a celebrity memoir, Her Mother's Daughter," Booklist, the review journal of the American Library Association wrote, "Despite the suggestive subtitle, Carroll's memoir is far less tell-all than it is her personal recollections of growing up feeling alienated from her adoptive family, her peers, and her religion. ... A thoughtful memoir of one woman's coming-of-age in the turbulent 1960s and 1970s."

As of 2015, Carroll has five children and ten grandchildren.

Works
Her Mother's Daughter: A Memoir of the Mother I Never Knew and of My Daughter, Courtney Love Doubleday. 2006.
Remember Who You Are: Seven Stages on a Woman's Journey of Spirit Conari Press. 2008. 
Love Cycles: The Five Essential Stages of Lasting Love New World Library. 2014.

References

External links
 http://www.lindaacarroll.com

1944 births
Living people
American adoptees
American people of Cuban descent
American psychotherapists
American women writers
Oregon State University alumni
University of Oregon alumni
21st-century American women